The 2020 Internazionali di Tennis del Friuli Venezia Giulia was a professional tennis tournament played on clay courts. It was the 17th edition of the tournament which was part of the 2020 ATP Challenger Tour. It took place in Cordenons, Italy between 31 August and 6 September 2020.

Singles main-draw entrants

Seeds

 1 Rankings are as of 24 August 2020.

Other entrants
The following players received wildcards into the singles main draw:
  Riccardo Bonadio
  Luciano Darderi
  Luca Nardi

The following player received entry into the singles main draw using a protected ranking:
  Maximilian Marterer

The following players received entry into the singles main draw as special exempts:
  Carlos Alcaraz
  Lorenzo Musetti

The following players received entry from the qualifying draw:
  Francisco Cerúndolo
  Alexandre Müller
  Andrea Pellegrino
  Giulio Zeppieri

Champions

Singles

  Bernabé Zapata Miralles def.  Carlos Alcaraz 6–2, 4–6, 6–2.

Doubles

  Ariel Behar /  Andrey Golubev def.  Andrés Molteni /  Hugo Nys 7–5, 6–4.

References

2020 ATP Challenger Tour
2020
2020 in Italian tennis
August 2020 sports events in Italy
September 2020 sports events in Italy